Stapleton Road railway station is on the Severn Beach Line and Cross Country Route, serving the inner-city district of Easton in Bristol, England. Its three letter station code is SRD. The station has two platforms, four running lines and minimal facilities. It is managed by Great Western Railway, the seventh company to be responsible for the station, and the third franchise since privatisation in 1997.

The station was opened in 1863 by the Bristol and South Wales Union Railway, with a single track and platform. The line was doubled in 1874 when the Clifton Extension Railway opened, then expanded to four tracks and platforms in 1888. There were buildings on all platforms and a goods yard to the north. Stapleton Road became one of Bristol's busiest stations, but service levels reduced significantly in the 1960s when reversing trains at Bristol Temple Meads became common. The goods facilities were closed in 1965, staff were withdrawn in 1967 and the line was reduced to two tracks in 1984.

In 2018, two additional running lines were added to increase capacity as part of the 21st-century modernisation of the Great Western Main Line. The line was also due to be electrified, but this has now been deferred until the next control period, which runs from 2019 to 2024.

Description

Stapleton Road railway station is in the Easton area of Bristol. The surrounding area is primarily residential, with the M32 motorway to the north of the station, and an industrial and commercial area north of that. The station is named after the A432 Stapleton Road just north of the station. The station can be accessed by Belmont Street to the west, an unnamed access road to the east, or by a set of steps from Stapleton Road. Access to the southbound platform is via a slope of gradient greater than 1 in 12. Directly to the north of the station is a bridge over the A432, then a bridge over the M32, then Narroways Hill Junction, where the Severn Beach Line diverges from the Cross Country Route.

The station is on an alignment of 150 degrees, curving towards the east. There are two active platforms: the western platform, platform 1, serves northbound trains; the eastern platform, platform 2, serves southbound trains. The southern end of the platforms bridge the residential street St Mark's Road. Platform 2 is part of an "island" platform, the other face of which served the northbound "up fast" line through the station, which was removed in 1984 along with the southbound "down fast" and fourth platform which served it. Access between the platforms is via an open, stepped footbridge.

, facilities at the station are minimal – there is a metal and glass shelter and a row of seats on the northbound platform. The station is completely unstaffed, and there are no facilities for buying tickets. There are customer help points, giving next train information for both platforms. There are eight bicycle stands on the platform. A mural depicting local life and history is painted on the wall of platform 1.

The line through Stapleton Road has a speed limit of  northbound and  southbound. The loading gauge is W8, and the line handles over 15 million train tonnes per year.

Services

All services at Stapleton Road are operated by Great Western Railway using  and  Sprinter and  Turbo DMUs.

The typical off-peak service in trains per hour is:
 1 tph to 

On Sundays, the services to Avonmouth and Severn Beach are reduced to hourly. Southbound a single afternoon service continues beyond Bristol to  via Weston-super-Mare.

Express services, operated by CrossCountry pass through the station but do not stop.

History

At New Passage, passengers were transferred to a ferry to cross the Severn to continue on into Wales. The line, engineered by Isambard Kingdom Brunel, was built as single-track  broad gauge, with a platform on the west side of the track. The BSWUR was amalgamated with the Great Western Railway, which had from the beginning operated all BSWUR services, in 1868; and in 1873 the line was converted to  standard gauge. In 1874, the Clifton Extension Railway opened, connecting the Bristol Port Railway and Pier to the Great Western Railway at Narroways Hill Junction, north of Stapleton Road. To cope with the expected increase in traffic, the line was doubled, and a second platform was added to the east of the two tracks. Two more tracks were added in 1888, giving a layout of two sets of two tracks, with platforms on the outside and on an island in the middle. There were buildings on all the platforms, with the booking office on the eastern outer platform, at the head of the access road. The refreshment room was on the island platform, and a covered footbridge connected the platforms. There was a yard to the north of the station, on the other side of Stapleton Road, which handled goods traffic including coal and other minerals.

Stapleton Road became one of Bristol's busiest stations. Many would call at Stapleton Road instead of Bristol Temple Meads because this avoided having to run the locomotive around the train. In 1886, the daily Great Western service along the Clifton Extension Railway was 6 trains each way between Avonmouth and Temple Meads, 24 trains from Clifton Down to Temple Meads and 26 the other direction. By 1910 there were 17 services daily from Avonmouth to Temple Meads and 15 the other way, a further 20 trains each day operating between Clifton Down and Temple Meads. For many passengers on the Clifton Extension Railway, Stapleton Road was where they would change for services to South Wales and the South Coast of England, and by 1912 the station name boards showed "Stapleton Road Junction for Clifton and Avonmouth", although the station was never officially renamed. Circular trips via  were also common, and by 1930 a total of 350 trains would pass the station each day. The station was also used by excursion trains, and by trains of evacuees during the Second World War. By 1947, just before the start of the British Rail era, there were 33 daily services each direction between Avonmouth and Temple Meads, and 18 on Sundays. The station also saw the arrival of Prime Minister David Lloyd George in the 1920s.

When the railways were nationalised in 1948, Stapleton Road came under the aegis of the Western Region of British Railways. A gradual decline of services at Stapleton Road began. While as late as 1963 name boards at the station read "Bristol Stapleton Road", trains between South Wales and the South Coast were eventually re-routed via Bristol Temple Meads – the introduction of diesel multiple units making it easier for the trains to reverse – and no longer called at Stapleton Road. Passenger numbers along the Clifton Extension Railway, now known as the Severn Beach Line, also dropped, and in 1963 the Beeching report suggested that all services along the line be withdrawn. In the end, services continued to Severn Beach but were discontinued via Henbury and Pilning. The goods yard was closed on 29 November 1965, and staff were withdrawn from the station from 17 July 1967 as a cost-saving measure. In 1975 the M32 motorway was opened north of the station, passing through the southern end of the goods yard. The eastern tracks were removed in 1984, although the bridge which carried the line across the A432 and M32 was left intact. The remaining station buildings were demolished at the same time, the buildings on the island platform having already been removed by 1958. Plans to use the disused trackbed as part of a light rail scheme linking the city centre to the northern suburbs were formed in the late 1990s, with the aim of an operational scheme by 2008, but the plans had been shelved by 2004. It was suggested in 2008 that the trackbed could be used as a cycle path to join together communities which had been separated by the construction of the M32 motorway, however this was dropped due to Network Rail asserting that the trackbed might be necessary for future rail expansion.

British Rail was split into business-led sectors in the 1980s, at which time operations at Stapleton Road passed to Regional Railways. All trains along the Severn Beach Line ran to Severn Beach, but the service pattern was irregular. This was changed in the mid-1990s, with a more frequent service to Avonmouth but very few on to Severn Beach and no Sunday services. Services at Stapleton Road were boosted due to the proximity of Eastville Stadium, but this use ended in 1986 when Bristol Rovers F.C. moved to Twerton Park in Bath.

When the railway was privatised in 1997, local services were franchised to Wales & West, which was succeeded by Wessex Trains, an arm of National Express, in 2001. The station was brightened in 1999 when a mural illustrating local life was painted on the wall of the western platform by Bill Guilding. Services along the Severn Beach Line were increased to 10 per day in each direction by 2005, with Bristol City Council providing a subsidy to Wessex Trains. The Wessex franchise was amalgamated with the Great Western franchise into the Greater Western franchise from 2006, and responsibility passed to First Great Western, a subsidiary company of FirstGroup, rebranded in 2015 as Great Western Railway. A minimum service requirement was written into the franchise agreement, ensuring an hourly service along the Severn Beach Line. Passenger traffic increased significantly, and in 2010, Sunday services to Severn Beach were restored.

By 2005, the disused eastern trackbed was filled with rubble, brambles and weeds, and the station had acquired a bad reputation due to muggings and the use of illegal drugs on the station premises. A community garden project, Eastside Roots, was set up in the disused trackbed by local permaculture enthusiast Nick Ward in 2009. It was built using sustainable materials, including bricks dug out during the construction of the Cabot Circus shopping centre. The project led to a general improvement of the station ambience, and residents were more willing to use it. The footbridge was replaced in 2013 to allow for electrification of the line, but the new, higher, bridge angered local residents who felt it infringed on their privacy. The station entrance, including walls and gates, were decorated in 2020 by local artists.

Future
First Great Western declined a contractual option to continue the Greater Western passenger franchise beyond 2013, citing a desire for a longer-term contract due to the impending upgrade to the Great Western Main Line. The franchise was put out to tender, but the process was halted and later scrapped owing to the fallout from the collapse of the InterCity West Coast franchise competition. A two-year franchise extension until September 2015 was agreed in October 2013, and subsequently extended until March 2019.

The line through Stapleton Road was due to have been electrified by 2017 as part of the Great Western Main Line electrification project, however this has been postponed indefinitely. The group Friends of Suburban Bristol Railways supports the electrification continuing beyond the main lines, as does MP for Weston-super-Mare John Penrose. The electrification scheme also includes the four-tracking of Filton Bank, including the reinstatement of the disused trackbed at Stapleton Road, to allow more services between Parkway and Bristol Temple Meads and separate fast inter-city services from local stopping services. The two eastern platforms at Stapleton Road will be demolished to allow trains to run faster, although it has been suggested that they be kept for use in case of service disruptions.

Stapleton Road is on the / corridor, one of the main axes of the Greater Bristol Metro, a rail transport plan, which aims to enhance transport capacity in the Bristol area, including half-hourly services along the Severn Beach Line. Plans for a loop were rejected by the West of England Joint Transport Board, but Bristol City Councillors voted to send the decision back to the board for further discussion.

See also
Rail services in Bristol
MetroWest

Notes

References

External links

 Friends of Suburban Bristol Railways
 Severn Beach Line: Information, Maps & Timetables for Stapleton Road station

Railway stations in Bristol
DfT Category F2 stations
Former Great Western Railway stations
Railway stations in Great Britain opened in 1863
Railway stations served by Great Western Railway
Severn Beach Line